BSC Saturn 77 Köln, commonly known as Saturn Köln or Saturn Cologne, was a professional basketball club based in the fourth-largest city of Germany, Cologne. Established in 1977, Saturn won its first Basketball Bundesliga title in 1981, crowning themselves German champions. Saturn went on to win four titles in the 80s, as well as three German Cup titles. In 1993, the club was dissolved.

History 
The club originated in 1977 from the divested basketball department of ASV Köln. Legally, the spin-off took place, however, only in 1978. The basketball department of ASV Köln played already from 1969–70 to 1971–72, in the season 1973–74 and 1975 to spin-off in the National Basketball League.

Saturn have won four German Championships and three national Cup all the titles in the glory days of 80s. The main sponsor was since June 1977 Fritz Waffenschmidt, then owner of the Saturn stores. The sale of the Saturn stores on the Kaufhof department store group in March 1984 it was the end of the funding for the club to the top basketball ended abruptly in Cologne. Attempts to financial cooperation with Galatasaray Istanbul failed miserably. The Club 1989 renamed due to the cooperation in Galatasaray Cologne, introduced in 1990 for bankruptcy and had to stop the game mode. In 1993, the club was formally dissolved.

Highlights in the history of Saturn Köln for the European competitions came to late 80s in FIBA European Champions Cup where they arrived until quarter final group stage in 1987–88 season and face the best European basketball clubs of the era as Partizan, Aris, Tracer Milano, Maccabi Tel Aviv, FC Barcelona, Orthez and Nashua Den Bosch. The next season Saturn eliminated in the round of 16 by the Dutch Nashua Den Bosch. Also Saturn after a significant qualification against Monaco arrived until quarter final group stage in 1983–84 FIBA European Cup Winners' Cup where they made excellent performances and eliminated with a 3 wins-3 defeats record by Simac Milano and Cibona.

Titles and achievements 
German League
 Winners (4): 1980–81, 1981–82, 1986–87, 1987–88
German Cup
 Winners (3): 1979–80, 1980–81, 1982–83

Notable players 

Germany:
  Stephan Baeck
  Holger Geschwindner
  Hansi Gnad
  Michael Jackel
  Michael Pappert
  Uwe Sauer
  Klaus Zander

Europe:
  Dragan Kapičić

USA:
  Johnny Neumann

Head coaches 
  Ralph Klein: (1983–86)
  Tony DiLeo: (1986–1988) 

BSC Saturn Köln
1977 establishments in West Germany
Basketball in North Rhine-Westphalia
Basketball teams established in 1977
Basketball teams in Germany